Zakrzew may refer to the following places:
Zakrzew, Łowicz County in Łódź Voivodeship (central Poland)
Zakrzew, Radomsko County in Łódź Voivodeship (central Poland)
Zakrzew, Rawa County in Łódź Voivodeship (central Poland)
Zakrzew, Sieradz County in Łódź Voivodeship (central Poland)
Zakrzew, Lublin County in Lublin Voivodeship (east Poland)
Zakrzew, Radzyń Podlaski County in Lublin Voivodeship (east Poland)
Zakrzew, Garwolin County in Masovian Voivodeship (east-central Poland)
Zakrzew, Kozienice County in Masovian Voivodeship (east-central Poland)
Zakrzew, Radom County in Masovian Voivodeship (east-central Poland)
Zakrzew, Sochaczew County in Masovian Voivodeship (east-central Poland)
Zakrzew, Węgrów County in Masovian Voivodeship (east-central Poland)
Zakrzew, Greater Poland Voivodeship (west-central Poland)